Boy Scouts is the stage name of Oakland, California musician Taylor Vick.

History
Boy Scouts began in the late 2000s. In 2010, Vick released her first album titled garagebandaid. In 2016, Vick released her second full-length album titled Homeroom Breakfast. In 2017, Vick released an EP titled Hobby Limit. In 2019, Vick released her first album on ANTI- Records titled Free Company. In 2021, Vick's second album under the moniker Boy Scouts, Wayfinder, was released on October 1.

Discography
Studio albums
garagebandaid (2010, self-released)
Homeroom Breakfast (2016, Mt. Home Arts)
Free Company (2019, ANTI-)
Wayfinder (2021, ANTI-)
EPs
Hobby Limit (2017, Processional Cross)

References

Musicians from Oakland, California